Mohd Nidzam bin Jamil (born 15 April 1980) is a former Malaysian footballer Selangor.  He is also a former member of the Malaysian national team. His present position as assistant head coach of Malaysia Super League club Selangor.

Playing career
He spend his majority professional career at Selangor F.C. He has started his career in football at the age of 18 in President Cup squad. He also played with PKNS FC, Negeri Sembilan FA and Proton FC.

Due to injuries and multiple operations on his ankle and knees, he decided to stop playing at the age of 28 and started to concentrate in coaching arena.

Coaching career

SPA FC 
At the age of 32, he is one of the youngest coach that has won the senior national level championship title in Malaysia as a coach, for SPA FC in the 2012 Malaysia FAM League. Also in 2012 Malaysia FA Cup tournament, he guided the team to the quarter final, where SPA FC has become the first team from FAM League to reach this stage so far.

Air Asia F.C. 
He also have coached AirAsia F.C. in the FAM League and guided Malaysia University Football team in 29th World University Games Summer Universiade at Taipei 2017.

Felda United F.C. 
In 2017, he was appointed as assistant head coach of Felda United F.C. After B. Sathianathan leaves his post as the team's head coach in November 2018, Nidzam were promoted to head coach position.

Selangor F.C. 
After 18 years later on 22 November 2021, Nidzam had officially returned to his "home" again Selangor F.C. and appointed as assistant coach for Head Coach Michael Feichtenbeiner.

On 9 August 2022, Selangor F.C. announced that the management and Michael Feichtenbeiner have mutually agreed to let go of his position as the First Team Head Coach of Selangor F.C. and continue the football development project as Selangor F.C.’s Sporting Director which he has held since 2020. In the meantime, the First Team Head Coach responsibilities will be taken up by the Assistant Head Coach, Nidzam Jamil as Interim Head Coach for the remainder of the 2022 Malaysian League season.

National team
Nidzam has played for Malaysia national football team, and the Malaysia under-23 team. Both teams he played for were then under the charge of Allan Harris.

He scored his only international goal in the 2002 Tiger Cup competition, a penalty against Laos in the group stage.

International goals

Personal life
He also appeared in Malaysia satellite TV channel Astro Arena as football pundit or as guest commentator in their Malaysian football league programmes. His late brother Zaid Jamil was also a footballer and had represented Selangor and Malaysia.

In 2018,his football life has been featured in a Digi Hari Raya short clip called Niat or Nawaitu. The clip features the life of Nidzam Jamil and his late brother

Managerial statistics

Honours

Player
Selangor
Malaysia Cup: 2002
Malaysia Charity Shield: 2002

Manager
SPA F.C.
Malaysia FAM League: 2012

References

External links
 

 http://www.stadiumastro.com/sukan/blog/blog-butiran/bola-sepak-moden-dari-kaca-mata-jurulatih-muda-nidzam-bah-1/4936

Malaysian footballers
Malaysia international footballers
Selangor FA players
Negeri Sembilan FA players
Living people
1980 births
People from Selangor
Footballers at the 2002 Asian Games
Southeast Asian Games silver medalists for Malaysia
Southeast Asian Games medalists in football
Association football defenders
Competitors at the 2001 Southeast Asian Games
Asian Games competitors for Malaysia